Pavllo (Pavle) Bukoviku (Bagaviki) (born 6 June 1939) is an Albanian retired football player.

Club career
Nicknamed Ben, he played for both KF Tirana (then Pune and 17 Nëntori Tiranë) and Partizani and, winning 6 league titles in total. He only played for army club Partizani during his military service. After retiring as a player, he was a referee for 16 years between 1974 and 1990.

International career
He made his debut for Albania in a June 1963 Olympic Games qualification match against Bulgaria and earned a total of 5 caps, scoring no goals. His final international was a May 1965 FIFA World Cup qualification match against Northern Ireland.

Personal life
His older brother Teofili won two league titles playing under the name Tafil Baci.

Honours
Kategoria Superiore: 6
 1959, 1961, 1965, 1966, 1968, 1970

Albanian Cup: 2
 1961, 1963

References

External links

1939 births
Living people
Footballers from Tirana
Albanian footballers
Association football forwards
Albania international footballers
FK Partizani Tirana players
KF Tirana players
Albanian football referees